Cancelloxus elongatus, the whiteblotched klipfish, is a species of clinid found in subtropical waters of the Atlantic Ocean along the South African coast. It can reach a maximum length of  TL. This species preys primarily on zoobenthos.

Description
Fins: Dorsal fin spines 38 to 43, rays 3 to 4; Anal fin spines 2, rays 27 to 32; Pectoral fin rays 11 to 12; Ventral fin spines 1, rays 3. 
Gill rakers (1 to 2)+(5). 
Vertebrae (15 to 16)+(33 to 34). 
Lateral line with 7 tubed scales in front part and about 18 to 22 small shallow pits mid-laterally.
Body depth 7.1 to 9.6 in Standard length.
Head length 4.2 to 4.6 in Standard length.
Eye 6.4 to 7.2 diameters in head length. 
Caudal peduncle 7 to 10% standard length.

Shape:
 
The body is elongate, with a pointed head and slightly projecting lower jaw. The dorsal and ventral profiles are straight. The eyes are small. The dorsal fin as low and of even height, with slender and flexible front spines, and the last 5 to 7 spines stiff and sharp. Dorsal fin origin is above the opercle. Pelvic fin rays extend about a third of their length beyond the membrane, with the last ray well developed and more than half the length of middle ray.

Colour:

Pale to white with two dark vertical bars which blends in with the substrate on which they live and burrow.

Size:

Attains 5 cm.

Distribution

South African south coast from Storms River mouth to Algoa Bay.

Habitat

Fragmented shell and sand substrate areas near rocks in 10-25m.

Etymology
Elongatus: as in elongated, referring to the body shape.

References

elongatus
Fish described in 1986